Zarzysko  is a village in the administrative district of Gmina Oleśnica, within Oleśnica County, Lower Silesian Voivodeship, in south-western Poland. Prior to 1945 it was in Germany. Area of Zarzysko, Olesnica (Gmina) is 79107m2. Population is only 17. Population change from 1975-2015 is +325%. There was no population change 2000-2015. Timezone is Central European Summer Time.

References

Zarzysko